William Hull (1753–1825) was Territorial Governor of Michigan.

William Hull may also refer to:

William Hull (artist) (1820–1880), British watercolour painter
William E. Hull (1866–1942), U.S. Representative from Illinois
William Hull (Wisconsin politician) (1815–1881), American lawyer and politician
William Lovell Hull (1897–1992), Canadian cleric
William Raleigh Hull, Jr. (1906–1977), US Representative from Missouri
Billy Hull (born 1912), Northern Irish loyalist activist
Bill Hull (born 1940), American football player
William Hull (MP), Member of Parliament (MP) for Warwick
 William Roper Hull (1856–1925), Canadian rancher, businessman, and philanthropist

See also
William Hulle (disambiguation)